Mrs Chatterjee Vs Norway is a 2023 Indian Hindi-language legal drama film written and directed by Ashima Chibber. It stars Rani Mukerji, Anirban Bhattacharya, Neena Gupta and Jim Sarbh in lead roles. The film is inspired by the real life story of an Indian couple whose children were taken away by Norwegian authorities in 2011. It was released on 17 March 2023.

Plot 
Debika lives in Stavanger with her husband Aniruddha, son Shubha and five months old daughter Shuchi. Sia and Matilda of Velfred, a child welfare service, visit them regularly before snatching Shubha and Shuchi during the last visit. The Chatterjees are shocked and they are told that they can't hold custody of their children as they are unfit to do so. Debika decides to fight the government and get her children's custody back. During the course of the case, Debika finds out shocking truths regarding the child custody system in Norway that prompts her to take a significant step. What happens next forms the rest of the film.

Cast 
 Rani Mukerji as Debika Chatterjee
 Anirban Bhattacharya as Aniruddha Chatterjee, Debika's husband
 Jim Sarbh as Daniel Singh Ciupek, lawyer of Norway
 Neena Gupta as Vasudha Kamat, Indian External Affairs Minister (character based on Sushma Swaraj) 
 Kärt Tammjärv as Sia
 Britta Soll as Matilda
 Barun Chanda as Abhijeet Dutta, Judge of Kolkata High Court
 Balaji Gauri as Advocate Ms. Pratap
 Mithu Chakraborty as Aniruddha's mother
 Soumya Mukherjee as Anurag Chatterjee, Aniruddha's brother
 Bodhisattwa Majumder as Debika's father
 Saswati Guha Thakurta as Debika's mother
 Varun Vazir as Biswajeet Sarkar
 Charu Shankar as Nandini
 Roopangi Vanvari as Rabia
 Sara Soulié as Berit Hansen, Teacher at Velfred
 Yuvaan Vanvari as Shubha Chatterjee, Debika and Aniruddha's son
 Kristjan Sarv as Lars Kristiansen (official from Velfred)

Production

Development 
The film was announced by Rani Mukerji in March 2021. 

The film is inspired by the real story of Sagarika Chakraborty and her husband, an Indian couple living in Norway whose children were taken away by the Norwegian Child Welfare Services, who had objections against parenting habits that are considered typical in Indian culture.

Filming 
Principal photography began in August 2021. The first production schedule took place in Estonia and was completed by 21 September 2021. The film was wrapped up on 18 October 2021.

Release 
The film was theatrically released on 17 March 2023.

Following the release of the film, Norwegian Ambassador Hans Jacob Frydenlund criticized the movie, stating that "it incorrectly depicts Norway’s belief in family life and our respect for different cultures." This was countered by Sagarika Chakraborty who condemned the statements made by him adding, "When the whole world can see the bond between me and my kids, the Norwegian Government continues to spread lies about her without even knowing her story". She also said that she's getting a lot of love from all over the world and people want to come and meet her after the film. Sagarika said that the Indian Government has helped her immensely.

Music 

The music of the film is composed by Amit Trivedi. Lyrics are written by Kausar Munir.

Reception

Critical reception 
The film received mixed to positive reviews from critics alike. Zinia Bandyopadhyay of India Today gave the film three and a half stars out of five and said, "The best thing about the film is, undoubtedly, Rani Mukerji’s performance. It is not a light watch, but something that is compelling and emotional. However, by the end, the film feels a bit stretched." Bollywood Hungama gave the film three stars out of five and said, "It is a hard-hitting drama and is laced with the career-best performance of Rani Mukerji." Monika Rawal of Hindustan Times said, "It remains a true-to-heart account of a gut-wreching story of a mother but there are so many layers you wish the director dug deeper and explored with the main character."

Sukanya Verma of Rediff.com said, "Instead of feeling her desperation, despair or extreme acts stemming from a mother's primal need to protect her brood, what comes through is hollow theatrics." Saibal Chatterjee of NDTV gave the film one and a half stars out of five and said, "It is an overheated affair that sucks the air out of an intrinsically moving story that deserved infinitely better." Udita Jhunjhunwala from Mint Lounge said, "It was hard to root for the Chatterjees in a film that has greater recall as a tear-soaked Bollywood drama than a recreation of a real life human-interest story."

Box office 
The film collected  on its opening day with releasing on 500 screens. The collections saw a 77.95% jump on the second day with the film collecting .

References

External links 
 
 

Unreleased Hindi-language films
Films set in Norway
Films shot in Estonia
Films about immigration to Europe